The Valencia County News-Bulletin is a weekly newspaper in Belen, New Mexico, that was established in 1910 by Number 9 Media, a subsidiary of the Albuquerque Journal. It is currently the fifth largest newspaper in New Mexico, with a circulation of 22,500.

References

External links

Newspapers published in New Mexico